Peter Heinrich Schwartze (born 23 May 1931, in Bad Salzuflen) is a German neurophysiologist, systems scientist and cyberneticist well known in the ex-German Democratic Republic. 
Schwartze graduated the medical University in Leipzig, Germany in 1957 and specialized in Neurophysiology. He studied and worked at the universities of Rostock, Greifswald and Leipzig. He became Doctor Habilitatus of the University Leipzig, Germany in 1968 and Professor of Pathophysiology in 1978 and served as the Director of the Carl Ludwig Institute of Physiology between 1980 and 1992 as successor of Hans Drischel.

Prof. Schwartze also served as member of the East German Parliament between 1980-1990, in the Cultural Association fraction.

Scientific contributions
Schwartze studied the vestibular apparatus, the air-righting reflex and related spinal reflexes for over 30 years. He published hundreds of scientific reports (mostly in German journals) and a number of scientific and text books on issues of brain development, vestibulo-ocular reflexes and cybernetics.) He served as vice president of the Society for Experimental Research between 1978 and 81 and also served as member of the editorial board of many journals such as Pediatrics and Related Topics Journal and International Tinnitus Journal.

References

External links 
 Peter Schwartze, Local Newspaper, 1986.
 Peter Schwartze, Interview by Spiegel magazine.
 Archiv Leipzig University.

1931 births
Living people
People from Bad Salzuflen
People from the Free State of Lippe
Socialist Unity Party of Germany politicians
Members of the 8th Volkskammer
Members of the 9th Volkskammer
Cultural Association of the GDR members
Free German Youth members
German neuroscientists
Systems scientists
Cyberneticists
Leipzig University alumni